The Chengdu Museum of Contemporary Art is a contemporary art museum in Chengdu, China.

Overview
The museum opened in Tianfu Art Park as part of the 2021 Chengdu Biennale, together with the Chengdu Tianfu Art Museum. It is operated by the Chengdu Art Academy. The museum complex consists of three buildings; the others house an art library and a humanities library.

Gallery

See also
 Museum of Contemporary Art Chengdu (a different museum founded in 2011)

References

External links
 

2021 establishments in China
Art museums established in 2021
Contemporary art galleries in China
Museums in Chengdu
Arts in Chengdu